The Abyss Box is a vessel containing  of water at the very high pressure of 18 megapascals to simulate the natural underwater environment of bathyal fauna living at about  below the surface. It is on display at Oceanopolis aquarium in Brest, France. It was designed by French researcher Bruce Shillito from Pierre and Marie Curie University in Paris.

All the equipment maintaining the extreme pressure inside the Abyss Box weighs . The device keeps deep-dwelling creatures alive so they can be studied, especially regarding their adaptability to warmer ocean temperatures. Currently the Abyss Box houses only common species of deep sea creatures including a deep sea crab, Bythograea thermydron and a deep sea prawn, Pandalus borealis, which are some of the hardier species with a higher survival rate in depressurized environments.

See also 
Abyssal plain
 Deep sea
 Deep sea creature
 Deep ocean water
 Submarine landslide
 The Blue Planet
Shutdown of thermohaline circulation

References

External links
 Deep Sea Foraminifera – Deep Sea Foraminifera from 4400 metres depth, Antarctica - an image gallery and description of hundreds of specimens
 Deep Ocean Exploration on the Smithsonian Ocean Portal
 Deep Sea Creatures Facts and images from the deepest parts of the ocean
 How Deep Is The Ocean Facts and infographic on ocean depth

Brest, France
Climate change and the environment
Effects of climate change
Oceanography
Deep sea fish
Marine biology